Portuguese–North Korean relations are foreign relations between Portugal and North Korea.

History
Portugal established diplomatic relations with North Korea in February 1975.

The former Portuguese colony of Macau in particular has been an important focus of relations between the two countries. North Koreans have had a presence in Macau since the 1950s, training spies, doing business, and accommodating elites away from home. Since North Korea's relationship with China is more amicable than its relationship with Portugal, the importance of Macau has increased further since its handover to China in 1999.

Kim Yong-nam has made statements affirming the good relationship between the two countries, such as the condolences he gave then-President Jorge Sampaio when Francisco da Costa Gomes died, and the congratulations he extended to President Aníbal Cavaco Silva after he won the Portuguese elections.

In 2017, Portugal cut its diplomatic ties with North Korea. Portugal has confirmed it severed diplomatic ties with North Korea amid heightened international efforts to have the North halt its nuclear and missile provocations

See also 

 Foreign relations of Portugal
 Foreign relations of North Korea

References

Portugal
Bilateral relations of Portugal